Beyond the Sound Barrier is a live album by saxophonist Wayne Shorter released by Verve Records in 2005. It features Shorter’s ‘Footprints’ Quartet with pianist Danilo Perez, bassist John Patitucci and drummer Brian Blade.

Background 
The album was recorded from November 2002 to April 2004 in Europe, America, and Asia. Beyond the Sound Barrier received the 2006 Grammy Award for Best Instrumental Jazz Album.

Reception
Nate Chinan of Jazz Times wrote, "Beyond the Sound Barrier picks up where its predecessor left off: It’s another compilation of concert recordings from the band’s extensive travels. But where the epochal Footprints-Live! raided the classic Shorter catalog for material, this album sprinkles in several new tunes. They tend toward a mysterious rippling quality that justifies long and cosmic titles. The best of the bunch is the title track, which spins a seductive ostinato into a vast and mysterious koan."

Will Layman of PopMatters said, "Beyond the Sound Barrier does more than reinforce the marvel of Wayne Shorter’s return to brilliant, challenging acoustic jazz. This collection of concert recordings makes the argument that Wayne’s long hiatus served an important artistic purpose, and one that the first two comeback discs did not fully acknowledge. On Sound Barrier, Wayne’s quartet (including Danilo Perez on piano, John Patitucci on bass, and Brian Blade on drums) plays in a fully interactive style that eschews individual “solos” almost completely. There is not a single track that follows the usual jazz format of melody-solos-melody. Every one of these performances is a thematic exploration resembling a conversation between four equal partners—but a musical conversation of such exquisite cohesion and explosive discovery that each track seems an impossibility of grace."

Track listing 
All compositions by Wayne Shorter except where noted.
 "Smilin' Through" (Arthur Penn) – 11:52
 "As Far as the Eye Can See" – 6:27
 "On Wings of Song" (Felix Mendelssohn) – 4:35
 "Tinker Bell" – 1:59
 "Joy Ryder" – 11:19
 "Over Shadow Hill Way" – 12:33
 "Adventures Aboard the Golden Mean" – 6:03
 "Beyond the Sound Barrier" – 6:24

Personnel 
Musicians
Wayne Shorter – saxophones
Danilo Perez – piano
John Patitucci – bass
Brian Blade – drums

Production
Wayne Shorter – producer
Dahlia Ambach Caplin – A&R

Rob Griffin – engineer (recording, mixing, mastering)
Vincent Rousseau – engineer (recording, mixing)(tracks 2, 7)
Mark Wilder – engineer (mastering)
Maria Triana – assistant engineer (mastering)
Jeff Ciampa – assistant engineer (mastering)

Kelly Pratt – release coordinator
Theodora Kuslan – release coordinator
 Hollis King – art direction
Rika Ichiki – design
Henry Leutwyler – photography

References 

2005 live albums
Wayne Shorter live albums
Verve Records live albums
Grammy Award for Best Jazz Instrumental Album